The first season of the American television series El Señor de los Cielos, was developed by Telemundo, it premiered on April 15, 2013 and ended on August 5, 2013. The Show was broadcast from Monday to Friday in the time of 10 pm/9c. The season consisted of 74 episodes and it premiered with a total of 2.34 million viewers and ended with a total of 3.62 million viewers becoming the most watched series on Telemundo.

The season is starred by Rafael Amaya as Aurelio Casillas – A drug lord who is recognized for knowing how to transfer drug substances to Mexico, Colombia, and the United States, along with Ximena Herrera, Robinson Díaz, Raúl Méndez and Gabriel Porras.

Plot 
The season follows the life of Aurelio Casillas (Rafael Amaya), a drug lord who is recognized for knowing how to transfer drug substances to Mexico, Colombia, and the  United States. Aurelio and his wife Ximena (Ximena Herrera) have three children, Rutila (Carmen Aub), Heriberto (Ruy Senderos), and Luz Marina (Gala Montes). He also has his faithful brother Chacorta (Raúl Méndez) who helps him in all his illicit businesses. Aurelio would end up being cornered by the authorities after being found as he decides to undergo a face operation in which he supposedly dies, thus causing his empire of power to fall.

Cast

Main 
 Rafael Amaya as Aurelio Casillas
 Ximena Herrera as Ximena Letrán
 Robinson Díaz as Miltón Jiménez / El Cabo
 Raúl Méndez as Víctor Casillas / Chacorta
 Gabriel Porras as Marco Mejía

Recurring 

 Andrés Parra as Pablo Escobar
 Carmen Villalobos as Leonor Ballesteros
 Fernanda Castillo as Mónica Robles
 Sara Corrales as Matilde Rojas 
 Fernando Solórzano as Óscar Cadena
 Arturo Barba as Alí Benjumea / El Turco 
 Lisa Owen as Doña Alba Casillas 
 Juan Ríos Cantú as General Daniel Jiménez Arroyo / El Letrudo
 Angélica Celaya as Eugenia Casas
 Marco Pérez as Guadalupe Robles
 Tommy Vásquez as Álvaro José Pérez / El Tijeras 
 Fabián Peña as Jesús Linares
 Emmanuel Orenday as Gregorio Ponte
 Ruy Senderos as Heriberto Casillas
 Bianca Calderón as Roxana Mondragón
 Ángel Cerlo as General Castro
 Arnoldo Picazzo as Flavio Huerta
 Juan Ignacio Aranda as Ramiro Silva de la Garza
 Jorge Zárate as Juan Montoya
 Javier Díaz Dueñas as Don Anacleto "Cleto" Letrán
Rodrigo Abed as César Silva de la Garza, President of Mexico
Roberto Uscanga as Arturo Benitez, later becomes President of Mexico

Terina Suarez Murias as Rutila Casillas

Episodes

References 

2013 American television seasons
El Señor de los Cielos